Kincumber High School is a government-funded co-educational comprehensive secondary day school, located in Kincumber, in the Central Coast region of New South Wales, Australia.

The school's motto is, "To tomorrow".

Established in 1990, the school enrolled approximately 930 students in 2018, from Year 7 to Year 12, of whom five per cent identified as Indigenous Australians and one per cent were from a language background other than English. The school is operated by the NSW Department of Education; the principal is Brent Walker. Previous principal, Janine Debenham ran the school for five years.

The land on which the school lays upon is Aboriginal land.

See also 

 List of government schools in New South Wales
 Education in Australia

References

External links 
 
 NSW Department of Education and Training: Kincumber High School
 NSW Schools website

Educational institutions established in 1990
1990 establishments in Australia
Public high schools in New South Wales
Central Coast (New South Wales)